Postpartum chills is a  physiological response that occurs within two hours of childbirth. It appears as uncontrollable shivering. It is seen in many women after delivery and can be unpleasant. It lasts for a short time. It is thought to be a result of a nervous system response. It may also be related to fluid shifts and the actual strenuous work of labor. It is considered a normal response and there is no accompanying fever. A fever would indicate an infection. Reassurance is all that is needed and for the mother to be kept warm. It has been described as a fairly common and normal occurrence. It is thought to be possibly related to the environmental temperature.

References

Bibliography

Childbirth
Midwifery
Women's health